Tensift (Berber: Tansift) is a river in central Morocco. It originates in the eastern High Atlas, receiving water from many tributaries in the region. It passes close to the city of Marrakesh and has its outlet into the Atlantic Ocean at the ancient fortress of Souira Qedima, around 40 km south from Safi. Its water discharge changes according to rainfall; it is one of the ten major rivers of Morocco, but frequently can be waded through even close to its outlet.

See also 

 Oued Tensift Bridge

References 

Rivers of Morocco